Lewinella cohaerens  is a bacterium from the genus of Lewinella which has been isolated from mid-littoral mud in Biarritz in France.

References

Further reading

External links
Type strain of Lewinella cohaerens at BacDive -  the Bacterial Diversity Metadatabase

Bacteroidota
Bacteria described in 1970